The Conibear Shellhouse is a rowing training and support facility in Seattle, Washington, on the campus of the University of Washington.  It is used by the men's and women's rowing teams of the Washington Huskies.  The building was completed in 1949 and renovated in 2005. It is located on Lake Washington, near the Lake Washington Ship Canal. 

The facility is named after former coach Hiram Boardman Conibear.

The Conibear Shellhouse was built to replace the old Shell House, now known as the Canoe House, which is further south along the lake shore. The original Shell House was an old seaplane hangar that was turned over to the University of Washington after World War I.

See also 
 The Boys in the Boat
ASUW Shell House

References

External links
 Washington Rowing site
 Washington Rowing Foundation site

Buildings and structures in Seattle
College sports in Washington (state)
Sports venues in Seattle
1949 establishments in Washington (state)
Sports venues completed in 1949
Sports venues completed in 2005
1990 Goodwill Games venues
University of Washington campus
University of Washington